is a Japanese footballer currently playing as a defender for Vanraure Hachinohe.

Career statistics

Club
.

Notes

References

External links

1991 births
Living people
Japanese footballers
Association football defenders
Japan Football League players
J3 League players
FC Machida Zelvia players
Vanraure Hachinohe players